The 1903 Victorian Football Association season was the 27th season of the Australian rules football competition. For the first time in its history, the VFA introduced an annual finals series to determine the premiership. The premiership was won by the North Melbourne Football Club, after defeating  in the challenge final; it was the first premiership in the club's history, after having competed in the Association since its inaugural season in 1877.

Association membership 
The size of the association was increased from nine to ten teams in 1903, with the Preston Football Club – which had won the previous three Victorian Junior Football Association premierships – elevated to senior level and admitted to the competition.

Premiership 
The Association introduced a finals system to determine the major premiership for the season. Finals had been used by the rival Victorian Football League since its establishment in 1897, but this was the first time it had been used by the Association. The finals were played according to the amended Argus system – the system which had been in use in the League since 1902, except with a slight variation that the League would not adopt until 1907; in summary:
 The top four clubs after the eighteen home-and-home matches qualified for the finals
 In the first week of finals, 1st played 3rd and 2nd played 4th
 In the second week, the winners from the first week played against each other
 In the third week, the minor premier (i.e. the club atop the ladder after the home-and-home matches) played against the winner from the second week to decide the major premiership – unless the winner from the second week was the minor premier, in which case the premiership was awarded automatically.

Ladder

Finals

Notable events 
 Mr James Hall, who had served as Association president since 1901, retired from his position prior to the start of the season.  president, Mr Jason Cuming, was initially elected president in the annual general meeting in April 1903, but he declined the position; in a second election on 1 May, Essendon Town president Cr John George Aikman was elected president. Aikman served as president until his death in 1928.

External links 
 Victorian Football Association/Victorian Football League history (1877–2008)
 List of VFA premiers

References 

Victorian Football League seasons
VFL